Me and My Friend is an Irish television sitcom that aired on RTÉ Television for one series from 1967 to 1968. Starring actresses and comedians Maureen Potter and Rosaleen Linehan, it was RTÉ's first home-grown sitcom.

References

1967 Irish television series debuts
1968 Irish television series endings
1960s Irish television series
Irish television sitcoms
RTÉ original programming